Kelly Mathurin Berville (born 5 January 1978 in Colombes, Hauts-de-Seine) is a French retired footballer. A defender, he could operate as either a central defender or a left back.

External links

1978 births
Living people
Sportspeople from Colombes
French footballers
Association football defenders
Ligue 1 players
Ligue 2 players
Championnat National players
Valenciennes FC players
OGC Nice players
ASOA Valence players
FC Gueugnon players
Livingston F.C. players
Primeira Liga players
Liga Portugal 2 players
F.C. Penafiel players
F.C. Paços de Ferreira players
Cypriot First Division players
APOP Kinyras FC players
French expatriate footballers
Expatriate footballers in Scotland
Expatriate footballers in Portugal
Expatriate footballers in Cyprus
French expatriate sportspeople in Portugal
Footballers from Hauts-de-Seine